Dionysius I or Dionysius the Elder ( 432 – 367 BC) was a Greek tyrant of Syracuse, in Sicily. He conquered several cities in Sicily and southern Italy, opposed Carthage's influence in Sicily and made Syracuse the most powerful of the Western Greek colonies. He was regarded by the ancients as an example of the worst kind of despot—cruel, suspicious and vindictive.

Early life of Dionysius the Elder
Dionysius began his working life as a clerk in a public office. Because of his achievements in the war against Carthage that began in 409 BC, he was elected supreme military commander in 406 BC. In the following year he seized total power and became tyrant. He was married to Aristomache, and had a daughter by her, Arete. He was married at the same time to Doris of Locris, who bore him his son, Dionysius II of Syracuse.

Rise to power
Dionysius' rise to tyranny began when he was granted 600 mercenaries to guard his person after he staged a false attack on his own life. He managed to increase this guard to one thousand, and after gradually consolidating his power, he established himself as a tyrant. He employed a group of ancient mercenaries that most likely were Sileraioi. He imposed his mercenaries on all parts of the polis community. This act made it clear that democracy had ended in Syracuse. His rule was "unconstitutional and illegitimate and could not fail to provoke rebellions among the partisans of democratic government". Dionysius' position at home was threatened as early as 403 by those philosophically opposed to tyranny. Sparta, which had in the past deposed tyrants from Corinth to Athens, did not damn Dionysius and his autocracy. In fact, according to the historian Diodorus Siculus, relations between the two were very positive:

When the Lacedaemonians [Spartans] had settled the affairs of Greece to their own taste, they dispatched Aristus, one of their distinguished men, to Syracuse, ostensibly pretending that they would overthrow the government, but in truth with intent to increase the power of the tyranny; for they hoped that by helping to establish the rule of Dionysius they would obtain his ready service because of their benefactions to him.

Dionysius even received the privilege of conscripting mercenaries from lands under Spartan authority. The demise of such a prominent democratic polis and the subsequent actions of Dionysius represented a recurring norm in fourth-century Greek states, thanks to the prevalence of mercenaries. The mercenary and the tyrant went hand in hand; for example, Polybius noted that "the security of despots rests entirely on the loyalty and power of mercenaries". Aristotle wrote that some form of "guard" (i.e., a personal army) is needed for absolute kingship, and for an elected tyrant an optimum number of professional soldiers should be employed. Too few would undermine the tyrant's power, while too many would threaten the polis itself. The philosopher also notes that the people of Syracuse were warned not to let Dionysius conscript too many "guards" during his regime.

Conquests
He fought a war with Carthage from 397 BC to 392 BC with mixed success; his attempts to drive the Carthaginians entirely out of the island of Sicily failed, and at his death they were masters of at least a third of it. He also carried on an expedition against Rhegium, capturing it  and attacking its allied cities in Magna Graecia. In one campaign, in which he was joined by the Lucanians, he devastated the territories of Thurii and Croton in an attempt to defend Locri.

After a protracted siege, he took Rhegium in 386 and sold the inhabitants as slaves. He also pillaged the temple of Caere (then allied with Rome) on the Etruscan coast. In the Adriatic, to facilitate trade, Dionysius founded Ancona, Adria and Issa. After him, the Adriatic became a sea of Syracuse. In the Corinthian War, he joined the side of the Spartans and assisted them with mercenaries and ships (which contributed in  blocking the Athenians' supplies from the Black Sea forcing them to peace) .

In 385 BC, Alcetas of Epirus was a refugee in Dionysius' court. Dionysius wanted a friendly monarch in Epirus, so he sent 2,000 Greek hoplites and 500 suits of Greek armour to help the Illyrians under Bardyllis in attacking the Molossians of Epirus. They ravaged the region and killed 15,000 Molossians, and Alcetas regained his throne. He joined the Illyrians in an attempt to plunder the temple of Delphi. Sparta intervened under Agesilaus, however, and with aid from Thessaly, Macedonia, and the Molossians themselves, the Spartans expelled the Illyrians.

Death
According to some sources, after gaining a prize for one of his tragedies, “The Ransom of Hector” (see Intellectual tastes below), at a competition at the Lenaia festival at Athens, he was so elated that he drank himself to death. Others report that he died of natural causes shortly after learning of his play's victory in 367 BC. According to others, he was given an overdose of a sleeping potion by his physicians at the instigation of his son, Dionysius the Younger, who succeeded him as ruler of Syracuse. A similar theory, proposed by Justin, stated that Dionysius "was defeated and broken by constant warfare, and finally murdered by a conspiracy of his own kin".

His life was written by Philistus, but the work is not extant.

Intellectual tastes
Like Pisistratus, tyrant of Athens, Dionysius was fond of having literary men about him, such as the historian Philistus, the poet Philoxenus, and the philosopher Plato, but treated them in a most arbitrary manner. Diodorus Siculus relates in his Bibliotheca historica that Dionysius once had Philoxenus arrested and sent to the quarries for voicing a bad opinion about his poetry. The next day, he released Philoxenus because of his friends' requests, and brought the poet before him for another poetry reading. Dionysius read his own work and the audience applauded. When he asked Philoxenus how he liked it, the poet turned to the guards and said "take me back to the quarries." Plutarch relates a version of this story in his On the Fortune of Alexander.

He also posed as an author and patron of literature; his poems, severely criticized by Philoxenus, were hissed at the Olympic games, but having gained a prize for a tragedy on the Ransom of Hector at the Lenaea at Athens, he was so elated that he engaged in a debauch which, according to some sources, proved fatal. His name is also known for the legend of Damon and Pythias, and he features indirectly (via his son) in the legend of the Sword of Damocles. The Ear of Dionysius in Syracuse is an artificial limestone cave named after Dionysius.

Historical significance and legacy 

Dionysius was one of the major figures in Greek and European history. He was a champion of the struggle between the Greeks and Carthage for Sicily, and was the first to bring the war into the enemy's territory. He transformed Syracuse into the most powerful city in the Greek world, and made it the seat of an empire stretching from Sicily across to Italy. Although this empire was technically a constitutional republic, in fact it was the first Greek empire which was in effect a monarchy; in this, Dionysius foreshadowed the accomplishments of Alexander the Great and beyond him of Augustus. He also foreshadowed these later rulers in being one of the first Greek rulers to be given divine honors during his lifetime, and he made innovations in military technique, such as siege engines, which became a standard feature of warfare under Alexander the Great and later generals.

It has been theorized that Brennus was working in concert with Dionysius, who sought to control all of Sicily. Rome had strong allegiances with Messana, a small city state in north east Sicily, which Dionysius wanted to control. Rome's army being pinned down by Brennus' efforts would have assisted Dionysius's campaign.

Walls of Syracuse
In 402 BC Dionysius I began building the Circuit Walls of Syracuse, which included an impressive citadel, the Euryalus fortress, protecting the plateau to the northwest of Syracuse, the remains of which are still visible today. The walls were completed in 397 BC and had the following characteristics:

Length: 27 kilometers
Width at base: 3.3 m to 5.35 m
Number of known towers on circuit: 14 (including Euryalos)
Largest tower: 8.5 m x 8.5 m
Deepest ditch (at Euryalos fortress): 9 m
Building so big a fortress would have involved installing well over 300 tons of stone every day for 5 years.

Fictional references
Dionysius I is mentioned in Dante's Inferno (of the Divine Comedy) (1308–21) as a tyrant who indulged in blood and rapine and suffers in a river of boiling blood. A fictional version of Dionysius is a character in Mary Renault's historical novel The Mask of Apollo (1966). He also features prominently in L. Sprague de Camp's historical novel The Arrows of Hercules (1965) as a patron of inventors on the island of Ortygia near Syracuse. He is the main character in Valerio Massimo Manfredi's novel Tyrant (2003).  He is also featured in the 1962 film Damon and Pythias. He also features in  Friedrich Schiller's "Die Bürgschaft", as well as Osamu Dazai's reworked version "Run, Melos!".

See also
Archimedes of Syracuse
Pyrrhus of Epirus

Notes

Further reading
"Tyrant" a novel by Valerio Massimo Manfredi, 
 Brian Caven: Dionysius I: War-Lord of Sicily. Yale University Press, 1990, 
 Frances Pownall: "Dionysius I and the Loneliness of Power (or, The Tyrant as Cyclops)", in: Rafał Matuszewski (ed.). Being Alone in Antiquity. Greco-Roman Ideas and Experiences of Misanthropy, Isolation and Solitude. Walter de Gruyter, Berlin/Boston 2022, pp. 167–184.
 Lionel J. Sanders: Dionysius I of Syracuse and Greek Tyranny. Croom Helm, London 1987, 
 Lionel J. Sanders: Dionisio I di Siracusa e la tirannide greca. Translation of Alessandro Michelucci, EOTI, Sutri 2015, 
 Karl Friedrich Stroheker: Dionysios I. Gestalt und Geschichte des Tyrannen von Syrakus. Franz Steiner, Wiesbaden 1958
 Karl Friedrich Stroheker: Dionisio I. Immagine e storia del tiranno di Siracusa. Translation of Alessandro Michelucci, EOTI, Sutri 2014, 

|  style="width:25%; text-align:center;"|Preceded by:democracy position previously held by Thrasybulus in 465 BC
|  style="width:25%; text-align:center;"|Tyrant of Syracuse405–367 BC
|  style="width:25%; text-align:center;"|Succeeded by:Dionysius the Younger
|-

430s BC births
367 BC deaths
5th-century BC Syracusans
4th-century BC Syracusans
Ancient Greek rulers
Sicilian tyrants
Ancient Greek inventors
People of the Sicilian Wars